Wayne Memorial Hospital may refer to:

Wayne Memorial Hospital, Jesup, Georgia
Wayne Memorial Hospital (Ohio), Greenville, Ohio
Wayne Memorial Hospital (Pennsylvania), Honesdale, Pennsylvania
Wayne Memorial Hospital (North Carolina), Goldsboro, North Carolina